{{Speciesbox
| name = 
| genus = Commersonia
| species = amystia
| image = Commersonia amystia.jpg
| image_caption = Cultivated specimen in Bundanoon
| authority = C.F.Wilkins & L.M.Copel.
| synonyms_ref = 
| synonyms = {{collapsible list |
 Rulingia sp. 'Single NP' (L.M.Copeland 2009) 
 Rulingia dasyphylla  auct. non (Andrews) Sweet
 Rulingia dasyphylla auct. non (Andrews) Sweet
 Rulingia hermanniifolia auct. non (Gay ex Kunth) Endl.
 Rulingia hermanniifolia auct. non (Gay ex Kunth) Endl.
 Rulingia salviifolia auct. non (Hook. ex Steetz) Benth.
}}
}}Commersonia amystia is a species of flowering plant in the family Malvaceae and endemic to eastern Australia. It is a dwarf shrub with narrow egg-shaped leaves that are densely covered with star-like hairs on the lower surface, and has flowers with five white sepals that turn pink as they age, and five smaller white petals.

They are covered with white star-like hairs, densely so on the lower surface, and have wavy or irreglarly-toothed edges. Five white staminodes surround the central stye.

TaxonomyCommersonia amystia was first formally described in 2008 by Carolyn F. Wilkins and Lachlan Mackenzie Copeland in the journal Telopea from material collected by Copeland near Inverell in 2003. The specific epithet (amystia) means "large cup" and refers to the base of the petals.

Distribution and habitat
This commersonia grows in rock crevices in woodland and is known from populations near Inverell in New South Wales and in the Ballandean-Stanthorpe in Queensland.

EcologyCommersonia amystia'' appears to be killed by fire but to germinate abundantly after, then appears to become senescent a few years later.

References

amystia
Flora of New South Wales
Flora of Queensland
Plants described in 2008